Daredevil's Time (Hajdučka vremena) is a Yugoslavian film directed by Vladimir Tadej. It was released in 1977.

External links
 

1977 films
Croatian comedy films
1970s Croatian-language films
Yugoslav comedy films
Films set in the 1920s